Sir John Woolf (15 March 1913, London – 28 June 1999, London) and his brother James Woolf (2 March 1920, London – 30 May 1966, Beverly Hills, California) were British film producers. John and James founded the production companies Romulus Films and Remus Films, which were active during the 1950s and 1960s, and the distribution company Independent Film Distributors (known as IFD), which was active 1950–59 and handled the UK distribution of films such as The African Queen and Gift Horse, as well as several films made by their two production companies (such as Room at the Top).

Biography
John and James Woolf were the sons of the British producer C. M. Woolf (1879–1942), who was co-producer with Michael Balcon of two early Alfred Hitchcock films, Downhill (1927) and Easy Virtue (1928). Woolf senior was a major figure at Gaumont British and established General Film Distributors in 1937.

John and James were educated at Eton, while the older brother also attended Institut Montana, Switzerland. John was the sales manager of General Film Distributors until it was taken over by the Rank Organisation James worked for Columbia Pictures in the Hollywood publicity department. John Woolf served in World War II and was demobilised with the rank of major.

Romulus Films
When their father died in 1942, J. Arthur Rank became director of General Film Distributors. John returned from the Army as joint managing director. However, neither John or James enjoyed working for a large corporation. In 1948, they went to S.G. Warburg for financial backing for two new companies, Independent Film Distributors, and a production arm, Romulus Films. According to critic Ronald Bergan in his obituary of Sir John Woolf: "Their aims were ambitious: to produce artistically valuable and yet commercially viable films, whose subjects would be wider than the Little Englanderism of British pictures of the period, and featuring big stars." James Woolf's obituary in The Times stated that John "was the main financial brain and James primarily in charge of artistic policy."

The first Romulus release was Pandora and the Flying Dutchman (1951) with James Mason and Ava Gardner. The American director-producer Albert Lewin had begun to prepare the film for MGM, but James Woolf discovered on a Hollywood visit that the studio had cancelled the project because of Lewin's problems with the House Un-American Activities Committee. According to John, this resulted in the Woolf's concentration on developing transatlantic projects. Their mentor, Alexander Korda, advised against half-financing The African Queen (1951): "Two old people going up and down an African river . . . who's going to be interested in that? You'll be bankrupt!". Korda was proved wrong. From this John Huston film they gained international critical and financial success. Two further films directed by Huston followed, Moulin Rouge (1952) and Beat the Devil (1953), but were less successful.

Romulus became one of the most significant English production companies of the time. They made several films with producer Daniel Angel and helped turn Laurence Harvey, whom they had under contract, into a star. In the mid '50s they formed a partnership with Korda, helping him to finance his films, including Richard III (1955). By 1959, they estimated their movies had earned more than £3million overseas. John Woolf became interested in Room at the Top after seeing an interview conducted by Woodrow Wyatt with the novel's author John Braine on Panorama on 8 April 1957. He bought a copy of the book the next day, and quickly purchased the film rights.

Individually, John was instrumental in the formation of Anglia Television in 1958 and James wrote novels.

In 1963, the Woolf brothers ran into trouble from the film distributors' Defence Organisation owing to their refusal to withhold the rights to their old cinema films from the sale to television. There was some talk that their new films would be boycotted by British cinemas, but that did not happen.

Later career
By now the brothers were working separately. James went to Hollywood to produce King Rat. Shortly afterwards he was staying at the Beverly Hills Hotel when he failed to keep a dinner arrangement with director Lewis Gilbert about making a film version of the musical Oliver!. A hotel employee found him dead, sitting up in bed with an open book on his lap; the cause was reported to be a heart attack. He was 46 years old. Bryan Forbes later claimed the heart attack was brought on by an accidental overdose of painkillers. Gilbert had to pull out of the Oliver! project shortly before filming began because of his Paramount contract. John Woolf remembered The Fallen Idol (1948), which suggested to him that its director, Sir Carol Reed, had the requisite skills to work with children.

John continued his career as a producer. In 1968 he bought British and American Film Holdings from Minster Trust. That year he produced his first film on his own, Oliver!, which ended up winning the Oscar for Best Picture.

John Woolf was knighted in 1975 and remained a director of Anglia Television until 1983. In 1982 he joined Bernard Delfont and Max Rayne to form First Leisure Corporation, of which he was a director. He was also a trustee of the Cinema and Television Benevolent Fund.

Personal lives
James was gay and was rumoured to be a lover of Laurence Harvey.

John Woolf was married three times. His second wife was the actress Edana Romney. His third wife, Ann, was the daughter of director Victor Saville. She survived him. In 1999, the year of his death, John Woolf was estimated to be worth £40 million, through a combination of his films and shrewd investments.

In the late 1940s the brothers' uncle, Maurice Woolf, left £130,000 to a showgirl, Prudence Wise. John Woolf challenged the will and settled out of court.

Romulus revival
Sir John Woolf's son, Jonathan Woolf, revived Romulus Films as of 1999, producing the film Revelation (2001).

In 2013, Romulus Films, Ltd. changed directions from film production to regenerative medicine, being involved in a $5 million stock and warrant purchase funding arrangement with BioTime Inc.

In April 2021, Romulus signed a worldwide distribution deal with StudioCanal.

Appraisal
In 1971, film critic Alexander Walker wrote about James Woolf:
[He] was a rarity in British films at the time, and would still be so if he was alive today: a man of taste and judgement who loved craftsmanship and supported a director instead of suffocating him or using him as a surrogate talent for the film he himself would have liked to direct had he dared... He was an obsessional filmmaker, loving the wheeling and dealing, relishing the juggling with human talents that it involved, and taking pleasure in spotting youthful proteges and promoting their careers, thereby gaining a vicarious satisfaction from their success that was lacking in his own basically lonely nature.
Filmmaker Bryan Forbes concurred:
He was a midwife for talent and smacked many of us into life... He had a quick mind that panned and found the nuggets before other prospectors on the trail had even arrived at the mine... Jimmy was a shield, quite fearless when tackling the front offices. He knew everybody and he was rich enough in his own right not to have to depend on the largesse of others when it came to getting a project off the ground. He had taste: taste in actors, taste in subject matter... There was a sadness about him at times because he had demons to fight, and in the end he died alone.

In popular culture 
In 2022, John Woolf was portrayed by Reece Shearsmith in the British-American film See How They Run.

Selected filmography

I'll Get You for This (1951)
Pandora and the Flying Dutchman (1951)
Galloping Major (1951)
 The African Queen (1951)
The Late Edwina Black (1952)
Treasure Hunt (1952)
Women of Twilight (1952)
Moulin Rouge (1952)
Cosh Boy (1953)
Innocents in Paris (1953)
Beat the Devil (1953)
The Good Die Young (1954)
Carrington V.C. (1955)
I Am a Camera (1955)
Richard III (1955)
Sailor Beware (1956)
Dry Rot (1956)
The Bespoke Overcoat (1956) – short
The Iron Petticoat (1956)
Three Men in a Boat (1956)
After the Ball (1957)
The Story of Esther Costello (1957)
Time Lock (1957)
The Vicious Circle (1957)
The Silent Enemy (1958)
The Whole Truth (1958)
 Room at the Top (1959)
Term of Trial (1962)
The L-Shaped Room (1962)
The Wrong Arm of the Law (1963)
Heavens Above! (1963)
The Pumpkin Eater (1964)
Of Human Bondage (1964)
King Rat (1965)
Life at the Top (1965)

John Woolf only
Oliver! (1968) – producer
The Day of the Jackal (1973) – producer
No Sex Please: We're British (1973) – executive producer
The Odessa File (1974) – producer
Orson Welles' Great Mysteries (1974–77) (TV series) – executive producer
Alternative 3 (1977) (TV movie) – executive producer
Joe and Mary (1977) (TV movie) – executive producer
Roald Dahl's Tales of the Unexpected (1977–89) (TV series) – executive producer
Atom Spies (1979) (TV movie) – executive producer
Miss Morison's Ghosts (1981) (TV movie) – executive producer
The Kingfisher (1983) (TV movie) – executive producer

Notes

External links

Remus Films at BFI
Romulus Films at BFI
 Independent Film Distributors at BFI
 Sir John Woolf obituary

British film producers
People educated at Eton College
Sibling duos
Film production companies of the United Kingdom
Producers who won the Best Picture Academy Award